Baqerabad (also Romanized as Bāqerābād; also known as Bagher Abad and Bāqirābād) is a village in Baqerabad Rural District, in the Central District of Mahallat County, Markazi Province, Iran. At the 2006 census, its population was 1,366, in 386 families.

References 

Populated places in Mahallat County